Alfred Oliver ( – unknown) was a Welsh international footballer. He was part of the Wales national football team, playing two matches. He played his first match on 6 March 1905 against Scotland and his last match on 27 March 1905 against England.

See also
 List of Wales international footballers (alphabetical)

References

1882 births
Welsh footballers
Wales international footballers
Place of birth missing
Year of death missing
Association footballers not categorized by position